Muamba may refer to:

 Muamba (stew) or Moambe, ingredient in stews and sauces in African cuisine

People
 Artyom Ntumba Muamba (born 1993), Russian footballer
 Cauchy Muamba (born 1987), Canadian football player
 Fabrice Muamba, England footballer
 Hénoc Muamba, Canadian football player 
 Loick Pires, Portuguese footballer

See also
Mwamba, given name and surname